Amber Jane Butchart is a British fashion historian and writer. She has researched and appeared in programmes on the BBC, Channel 4, and Sky Arts. In 2018, she presented the BBC documentary series A Stitch in Time. Butchart teaches at London College of Fashion, and consults with the British police as a forensic garment analyst. She has also published several books on fashion history.

Education and early life
Butchart grew up in Kessingland, Suffolk, and has an MA in History and Culture of Fashion from London College of Fashion, now part of the University of the Arts London.

Career
Butchart is an associate lecturer at London College of Fashion, and was formerly head buyer for vintage clothing company Beyond Retro. Butchart also acts as a consultant forensic garment analyst to British police forces and crime scene investigators.

Butchart presented a segment in the BBC documentary series Civilisations Stories entitled The First Refugees regarding the silk-weaving Huguenot community of Spitalfields. In 2015 Butchart published Nautical Chic and curated an exhibition of the same name at the Fashion and Textile Museum.

Butchart is a regular guest on BBC Radio 4's Woman's Hour. In January 2017 she appeared on  Radio 4's The Museum of Curiosity where her hypothetical donation to this imaginary museum was "the colour mauve". She has also produced a two-part documentary for Radio 4 about the history of the vintage fashion industry entitled From Rags to Riches.

Butchart presented A Stitch in Time, a six-part series about the history of fashion broadcast on BBC Four in 2018. The costumes created by Ninya Mikhaila for the show were exhibited at the National Trust's Ham House between February and April that year. The show was praised for its delivery and accessibility, with one reviewer noting "anyone watching this could gain a real insight into how historical pieces are made and reinterpreted".

With make-up artist Rebecca Butterworth, Butchart presented a six-part series of historic make-up tutorials for English Heritage. The series was part of the charity's efforts to expand its audience, and the campaign led to English Heritage winning the 'Grand Prix' and 'Best UK Breakthrough Advertiser' prizes at the 2019 YouTube Works Awards. The videos spanned the Roman period to the Second World War and were released between 2018 and 2019.

In 2020, Butchart and Clara Amfo presented a podcast series on the history of fashion. The following year, Butchard curated part of the British Textile Biennial, using items from the Gawthorpe Textile Collection.

She regularly hosts fashion events, including Puttin’ on the Glitz: Fashion & Film in the Jazz Age at the British Library in 2014.

She is one half of DJ duo Broken Hearts along with Nisha Stevens.

Bibliography

The Fashion Chronicles: Style Stories of History's Best Dressed (2018, Mitchell Beazley )
Fashion Illustration in Britain: Society and the Seasons (2017,)
The Fashion of Film: Fashion Design Inspired by Cinema (2016,)
Nautical Chic (2015,)
Amber Jane Butchart's Fashion Miscellany: An Elegant Collection of Stories, Quotations, Tips & Trivia from the World of Style (2014,)

References

External links

Year of birth missing (living people)
20th-century births
Living people
Alumni of the University of the Arts London
Academics of the University of the Arts London
21st-century British historians
Fashion historians